Zerpanotia is a genus of moths of the family Tortricidae.

Species
Zerpanotia zerpana Razowski & Wojtusiak, 2006

See also
List of Tortricidae genera

References

External links
Tortricid.net

Tortricidae genera
Olethreutinae
Taxa named by Józef Razowski